The War Memorial of Montreal West is a monument in Montreal West, Quebec, Canada, It is beside the city hall in Memorial Park, which is on Westminster Avenue near Ainslie Road. It was sculpted by George William Hill. It is made of a granite base, and features a soldier going into battle. A wall of remembrance for the heroes of World War I and World War II stands behind the statue.

References

1921 in Canada
1921 sculptures
Bronze sculptures in Canada
Canadian military memorials and cemeteries
History of Montreal
Military history of Canada
Montreal West, Quebec
Monuments and memorials in Montreal
Outdoor sculptures in Montreal
Sculptures of men in Canada
Statues in Canada
World War I memorials in Canada